General elections were held in Grenada on 13 September 1962. Herbert Blaize's Grenada National Party won six of the ten seats and Blaize was appointed Chief Minister for the second time. Blaize served as Head of Government until the next general election in August 1967, initially as Chief Minister until March 1967, and subsequently when Grenada became a fully internally autonomous Associated State, as Grenada's first Premier. Voter turnout was 72.6.

Background
Grenada's Administrator, the Queens representative on the island, James Lloyd suspended the constitution, dissolved the Legislative Council, and removed Eric Gairy as Chief Minister in April 1962, following allegations concerning the Gairy's financial impropriety. Gairy had been Chief Minister for 10 months since August 1961 and his party the Grenada United Labour Party held a majority in the Legislative Council following the 1961 elections. The negative publicity surrounding the removal of Gairy led to a significant fall in support for GULP.

Results

References

Elections in Grenada
Grenada
1962 in Grenada
September 1962 events in North America